Body armor performance standards are lists generated by a certain country, to set requirements for armor to ensure that armor will perform reliably with greater transparency as to what armor may and may not defeat. As each country has regional threats which may be unique to it, some standards may include threats that are not present in others.

VPAM armor standard (Europe)
The VPAM scale as of 2009 runs from 1 to 14, with 1-5 being soft armor, and 6-14 being hard armor. Of note is the inclusion of special regional threats such as Swiss P AP from RUAG and .357 DAG. According to VPAM's website, it is apparently used in France and Britain.

The VPAM scale is as follows:

TR armor standard (Germany)
The Technische Richtlinie (TR) Ballistische Schutzwesten is a regulation guide in Germany for body armor. It is mainly issued for body armor used by the German police, but also for the German armed forces and civilian available body armor. Producers have to meet the criteria of the TR, if they want to participate in open competitive bidding made by German agencies. The TR specifies different Schutzklassen (SK), which translates to protection classes, which a body armor can have. It specifies five different classes ranging from L to 4 of ballistic protection (e.g. SK 4). It also gives specifications for additional Stichschutz (ST), protection against knives, using the same classes as the ballistic protection, but giving it the additional ST label (e.g. SK L ST). The ballistic tests to determine a class are now integrated into the VPAM guidelines, so that the tests differ just in minor details and only one test (SK 1) is significantly different as of 2008.

The TR scale is as follows:

The German TR are generally comparable to the American NIJ, but the German TR usually tests more threat scenarios, as there are no point-blank shots as well as no police special rounds. In contrast the NIJ tests for bigger calibers and higher man stopping power. And while the German TR tests smaller calibers and lighter bullets, it also tests more aggressive rounds, as the first test already uses steel FMJ bullets, while the NIJ uses normal FMJ rounds. In addition SK 4, the highest protection class, is specified to withstand three hits, while Level IV needs only to withstand one hit - although by a bigger caliber (7.62×63mm).

HOSDB armor standard (United Kingdom)
The Home Office Scientific Development Branch is governing standards and testing protocols for police body armor. 

BFD to be measured after each shot, maximum allowed BFD for HG1/A class is 44mm, and 25mm for the rest.

GOST armor standard (Russia)
GOST R 50744-95 is the Russian Federation standard for body armor. Prior to the 2017 revision, the threat levels ran from 1 to 6. Noticeably, it included threats with the suffix A, which denote heightened ratings as opposed to lowered ratings in the NIJ standard.

The old (pre-2017) standards are as follows:

With the 2017 revision, the standards have changed significantly. Threat classes now range from BR1 to BR6. 'A'-suffixed classes have been eliminated, and their test threats have been either merged into the new categories, such as Classes 6 and 6A being moved into Class BR5, or removed entirely, as in the case of Class 2A. Additionally, several of the threat levels have been increased in difficulty with the introduction of new test threats; most notably is the introduction of Class BR6, which requires the tested armor to survive three hits of 12.7×108mm B32 API. In spite of the more difficult test threats, the 16mm back-face deformation limit remains unchanged.

The updated standards from the 2017 revision are as follows:

NIJ armor standard (United States)
NIJ Standard-0101.06 has specific performance standards for bullet resistant vests used by law enforcement. This rates vests on the following scale against penetration and also blunt trauma protection (deformation): In the first half of 2018, NIJ is expected to introduce the new NIJ Standard-0101.07. This new standard will completely replace the NIJ Standard-0101.06. The current system of using Roman numerals (II, IIIA, III, and IV) to indicate the level of threat will disappear and be replaced by a naming convention similar to the standard developed by UK Home Office Scientific Development Branch. HG is for soft armor and RF is for hard armor. Another important change is that the test-round velocity for conditioned armor will be the same as that for new armor during testing. For example, for NIJ Standard-0101.06 Level IIIA the .44 Magnum round is currently shot at 408 m/s for conditioned armor and at 436 m/s for new armor. For the NIJ Standard-0101.07, the velocity for both conditioned and new armor will be the same. 

NIJ standards are used for law enforcement armors. The US and NATO military armor designs are tested using a standard set of test methods under ARMY MIL-STD-662F and STANAG 2920 Ed2. This approach defines the test process under the 662F/2920 standard. Each armor program can select a unique series of projectiles and velocities as required. The DOD and MOD armor programs-of-record (MTV for example) procure armor using these test standards. In addition, special requirements can be defined under this process for armors for flexible rifle protection, fragment protection for the extremities, etc. These military procurement requirements do not relate to NIJ, HOSDB or ISO law enforcement armor standards, test methods, garment size, projectiles or velocities.

In addition to the NIJ and HOSDB law enforcement armor standards, other important standards include German Police TR-Technische Richtlinie, Draft ISO prEN ISO 14876, and Underwriters Laboratories (UL Standard 752).

Textile armor is tested for both penetration resistance by bullets and for the impact energy transmitted to the wearer. The "backface signature," or transmitted impact energy, is measured by shooting armor mounted in front of a backing material, typically oil-based modeling clay. The clay is used at a controlled temperature and verified for impact flow before testing. After the armor is impacted with the test bullet, the vest is removed from the clay and the depth of the indentation in the clay is measured.

The backface signature allowed by different test standards can be difficult to compare. Both the clay materials and the bullets used for the test are not common. In general the British, German and other European standards allow 20–25 mm of backface signature, while the US-NIJ standards allow for 44 mm, which can potentially cause internal injury. The allowable backface signature for body armor has been controversial from its introduction in the first NIJ test standard and the debate as to the relative importance of penetration-resistance vs. backface signature continues in the medical and testing communities.

In general a vest's textile material temporarily degrades when wet.   Neutral water at room temp does not affect para-aramid or UHMWPE but acidic, basic and some other solutions can permanently reduce para-aramid fiber tensile strength. (As a result of this, the major test standards call for wet testing of textile armor.)  Mechanisms for this wet loss of performance are not known. Vests that will be tested after ISO type water immersion tend to have heat sealed enclosures and those that are tested under NIJ type water spray methods tend to have water resistant enclosures.

From 2003 to 2005, a large study of the environmental degradation of Zylon armor was undertaken by the US-NIJ.  This concluded that water, long-term use, and temperature exposure significantly affect tensile strength and the ballistic performance of PBO or Zylon fiber. This NIJ study on vests returned from the field demonstrated that environmental effects on Zylon resulted in ballistic failures under standard test conditions.

"Special Threats" are ratings of armour which provide protection against specific projectiles. For example, the NIJ guidelines do not have any specification for armor that can stop M855 armor piercing ammunition. As a result, some manufacturers have designated specific armours as "Level III+" (a designation not recognized by the NIJ) to specify armour which has up to level III protection and can protect against special threats like the M855, but does not provide level IV protection.

US military armor standards
Although the US military requirements for body armor mirror the NIJ's on a surface level, the two are very different systems. The two systems share a 44mm limit on back-face deformation, but SAPI-series plates increase linearly in protection (with each plate tested against the preceding plate's threats), and require a soft armor backer in order to reach their stated level of protection.

Ballistic testing V50 and V0
Measuring the ballistic performance of armor is based on determining the kinetic energy of a bullet at impact (Ek = ½ mv2). Because the energy of a bullet is a key factor in its penetrating capacity, velocity is used as the primary independent variable in ballistic testing. For most users the key measurement is the velocity at which no bullets will penetrate the armor. Measuring this zero penetration velocity (v0) must take into account variability in armor performance and test variability. Ballistic testing has a number of sources of variability: the armor, test backing materials, bullet, casing, powder, primer and the gun barrel, to name a few.

Variability reduces the predictive power of a determination of V0.  If for example, the v0 of an armor design is measured to be  with a 9 mm FMJ bullet based on 30 shots, the test is only an estimate of the real v0 of this armor. The problem is variability. If the v0 is tested again with a second group of 30 shots on the same vest design, the result will not be identical.

Only a single low velocity penetrating shot is required to reduce the v0 value. The more shots made the lower the v0 will go. In terms of statistics, the zero penetration velocity is the tail end of the distribution curve. If the variability is known and the standard deviation can be calculated, one can rigorously set the V0 at a confidence interval.  Test Standards now define how many shots must be used to estimate a v0 for the armor certification. This procedure defines a confidence interval of an estimate of v0. (See "NIJ and HOSDB test methods".)

v0 is difficult to measure, so a second concept has been developed in ballistic testing called the ballistic limit (v50). This is the velocity at which 50 percent of the shots go through and 50 percent are stopped by the armor. US military standard MIL-STD-662F V50 Ballistic Test define a commonly used procedure for this measurement. The goal is to get three shots that penetrate that are slower than a second faster group of three shots that are stopped by the armor. These three high stops and three low penetrations can then be used to calculate a v50 velocity.

In practice this measurement of v50 requires 1–2 vest panels and 10–20 shots. A very useful concept in armor testing is the offset velocity between the v0 and v50. If this offset has been measured for an armor design, then v50 data can be used to measure and estimate changes in v0. For vest manufacturing, field evaluation and life testing both v0 and v50 are used. However, as a result of the simplicity of making v50 measurements, this method is more important for control of armor after certification.

Military testing: fragment ballistics
After the Vietnam War, military planners developed a concept of "Casualty Reduction". The large body of casualty data made clear that in a combat situation, fragments, not bullets, were the most important threat to soldiers. After WWII, vests were being developed and fragment testing was in its early stages. Artillery shells, mortar shells, aerial bombs, grenades, and antipersonnel mines are all fragmentation devices. They all contain a steel casing that is designed to burst into small steel fragments or shrapnel, when their explosive core detonates. After considerable effort measuring fragment size distribution from various NATO and Soviet bloc munitions, a fragment test was developed. Fragment simulators were designed, and the most common shape is a right circular cylinder or RCC simulator. This shape has a length equal to its diameter. These RCC Fragment Simulation Projectiles (FSPs) are tested as a group. The test series most often includes 2 grain (0.13 g), 4 grain (0.263 g), 16 grain (1.0 g), and 64 grain (4.2 g) mass RCC FSP testing. The 2-4-16-64 series is based on the measured fragment size distributions.

The second part of "Casualty Reduction" strategy is a study of velocity distributions of fragments from munitions. The military engineering data showed that, like the fragment size, the fragment velocities had characteristic distributions. It is possible to segment the fragment output from a warhead into velocity groups. This established a set of goals for military ballistic vest design.

The random nature of fragmentation required the military vest specification to trade off mass vs. ballistic-benefit. Hard vehicle armor is capable of stopping all fragments, but military personnel can only carry a limited amount of gear and equipment, so the weight of the vest is a limiting factor in vest fragment protection. The 2-4-16-64 grain series at limited velocity can be stopped by an all-textile vest of approximately 5.4 kg/m2 (1.1 lb/ft2). In contrast to the design of vest for deformable lead bullets, fragments do not change shape; they are steel and can not be deformed by textile materials. The  FSP (the smallest fragment projectile commonly used in testing) is about the size of a grain of rice; such small fast moving fragments can potentially slip through the vest, moving between yarns. As a result, fabrics optimized for fragment protection are tightly woven, although these fabrics are not as effective at stopping lead bullets.

Backing materials for testing

Ballistic
One of the critical requirements in soft ballistic testing is measurement of "back side signature" (i.e. energy delivered to tissue by a non-penetrating projectile) in a deformable backing material placed behind the targeted vest. The majority of military and law enforcement standards have settled on an oil/clay mixture for the backing material, known as Roma Plastilena.  Although harder and less deformable than human tissue, Roma represents a "worst case" backing material when plastic deformations in the oil/clay are low (less than 20 mm). (Armor placed over a harder surface is more easily penetrated.) The oil/clay mixture of "Roma" is roughly twice the density of human tissue and therefore does not match its specific gravity, however "Roma" is a plastic material that will not recover its shape elastically, which is important for accurately measuring potential trauma through back side signature.

The selection of test backing is significant because in flexible armor, the body tissue of a wearer plays an integral part in absorbing the high energy impact of ballistic and stab events. However the human torso has a very complex mechanical behavior. Away from the rib cage and spine, the soft tissue behavior is soft and compliant. In the tissue over the sternum bone region, the compliance of the torso is significantly lower. This complexity requires very elaborate bio-morphic backing material systems for accurate ballistic and stab armor testing.  A number of materials have been used to simulate human tissue in addition to Roma. In all cases, these materials are placed behind the armor during test impacts and are designed to simulate various aspects of human tissue impact behavior.

One important factor in test backing for armor is its hardness. Armor is more easily penetrated in testing when backed by harder materials, and therefore harder materials, such as Roma clay, represent more conservative test methods.

Stab
Stab and spike armor standards have been developed using 3 different backing materials. The Draft EU norm calls out Roma clay, The California DOC called out 60% ballistic gelatin and the current standard for NIJ and HOSDB calls out a multi-part foam and rubber backing material.
 Using Roma clay backing, only metallic stab solutions met the 109 joule Calif. DOC ice pick requirement
 Using 10% Gelatin backing, all fabric stab solutions were able to meet the 109 joule Calif. DOC ice pick requirement.
 Most recently the Draft ISO prEN ISO 14876 norm selected Roma as the backing for both ballistics and stab testing.

This history helps explain an important factor in Ballistics and Stab armor testing, backing stiffness affects armor penetration resistance. The energy dissipation of the armor-tissue system is Energy = Force × Displacement when testing on backings that are softer and more deformable the total impact energy is absorbed at lower force. When the force is reduced by a softer more compliant backing the armor is less likely to be penetrated.  The use of harder Roma materials in the ISO draft norm makes this the most rigorous of the stab standards in use today.

References

Performance standards
Ballistics
Lists of standards
Weapons countermeasures